Mann Creek Dam (National ID # ID00285) is a dam in Washington County, Idaho, in the western part of the state, a few miles north-northeast of the town of Weiser.

The earthen dam was an irrigation project of the United States Bureau of Reclamation.  Completed in 1967, the dam impounds Mann Creek with a height of 148 feet above bedrock, and a length of 1176 feet along its crest.  The dam is operated by the local Mann Creek Irrigation District.

At closure it had a maximum capacity of 13,000 acre-feet but siltation reduced that number to 10,900 acre-feet by 1992. The western side of the lake is the location of the former Mann Creek State Park. Boating and fishing are the main recreational activities.

References 

Dams in Idaho
Reservoirs in Idaho
United States Bureau of Reclamation dams
Buildings and structures in Washington County, Idaho
Earth-filled dams
Dams completed in 1967
1967 establishments in Idaho